Margarita Nikolova Hranova-Boycheva  (in Bulgarian Маргарита Хранова) is a Bulgarian singer.

Biography 
Margarita Nikolova Hranova-Boycheva is born on 20 December 1951 in Sliven, Bulgaria. Her father - Nikola Hranov was officer from Bulgarian kingdom`s army. In high school she was a singer in the group Mayakovsky. Hristova starts to play on  a piano. She finished the National Academy of Music  in the class of Irina Chmihova. Hristova finished her education National Academy of Music (Bulgaria). She was awarded the Lifetime Achievement prize of the Golden Orpheus festival.

Filmography

Discography 
Маргарита Хранова/Margarita Hranova(1974)
Романтика/Romance(1977)
Моето мъжко момиче/My male girl(1979)
Далечни дни/Many days(1981)
5(1983)
C'est La Vie(1986)

References 

1951 births
Living people
Musicians from Sliven
20th-century Bulgarian women singers
Big Brother (Bulgarian TV series) contestants